The Claiborne Pell Bridge, commonly known as the Newport Bridge, is a suspension bridge operated by the Rhode Island Turnpike and Bridge Authority that spans the East Passage of the Narragansett Bay in Rhode Island (northeastern United States). The bridge, part of RI 138, connects the city of Newport on Aquidneck Island and the Town of Jamestown on Conanicut Island, and is named for longtime Rhode Island U.S. senator Claiborne Pell who lived in Newport. The Pell Bridge is in turn connected to the mainland by the Jamestown Verrazzano Bridge.

Dimensions
It is four lanes wide, two in each direction. On a clear day, the bridge's towers are visible from the observation plaza at the Gay Head Light in Aquinnah on the Massachusetts island of Martha's Vineyard, from the upper floors of skyscrapers in Providence (approximately 22 miles), and as far northwest as the parking lot of Stone Hill Marketplace in Johnston, RI (approximately 23 miles) and Interstate 295 south in Smithfield north of U.S. Route 44. The Providence skyline is likewise visible from the bridge deck.

Tolls

The Claiborne Pell Newport Bridge is a toll bridge. As of 2022, the toll is US$4.00 for cars with a non-resident EZ-Pass, and US$6.00 for cars without an EZ-Pass. The toll for Rhode Island residents with an EZ-Pass is US$0.83.

From its opening in 1969 until 2009, the toll could be paid by cash or with tokens, which were purchased at the RIBTA office in Jamestown. E-ZPass was introduced as a toll payment in 2008. Shortly thereafter, the tokens were phased out as a form of toll payment. The final day that tokens were accepted on the bridge was December 31, 2009. Following that date, the only accepted forms of payment were cash or E-ZPass.

Rhode Island residents with a Rhode Island E-ZPass pay a discounted toll of only 83 cents once they sign up for the RIR-RI Resident Discount Plan. Early in 2012, the Authority had voted to raise tolls for passenger vehicles to $5. However, on June 15, 2012, this plan was abolished as Rhode Island lawmakers approved tolls to be added to the newly built Sakonnet River Bridge in the future.  The bridge also charges a fee equal to the toll for improperly mounted E-ZPass transponders that require a toll-booth operator to manually raise the gate.  Out-of-state residents pay full price, even with a Rhode Island E-ZPass, making this bridge the only toll facility in the U.S. to give a residence discount that isn't limited to the adjacent neighborhoods. The bridge was the only toll road in Rhode Island until August 19, 2013, when the Authority began collecting tolls on the new Sakonnet River Bridge. However, toll collection on that bridge ended on June 20, 2014.

Cash tolling was discontinued on the bridge in October 2021 in favor of all-electronic tolling through EZ-Pass or bill-by-mail.

Bicycles and pedestrians are not permitted on this bridge, but Rhode Island Public Transit Authority bus #64 has bike racks for weekday and Saturday travel.

History
The bridge was constructed from 1966 to 1969 at a cost of U.S.$54,742,000 by the Parsons, Brinckerhoff, Quade & Douglas company.

The bridge opened on June 28, 1969, with ceremonies, celebrations, and fanfare.

The bridge was renamed for U.S. Senator Claiborne Pell in 1992, though it is still commonly referred to as the Newport Bridge by residents of nearby towns.

The bridge was featured on the Rhode Island state quarter in 2001.

The first time that runners were allowed over the bridge was when a group of 300 runners ran over in the early 1980s in a half-marathon for Save The Bay. In the fall of 2011, the inaugural Citizens Bank Newport Pell Bridge Run was held which marked the first time in recent history that runners were allowed to cross the bridge (which was closed to traffic).

Introduction of E-ZPass
In the spring of 2012, the Bridge Authority brought Open Road Tolling to the Pell bridge, allowing drivers with E-ZPass to pass through a special E-ZPass only toll lane at 40 mph. Violators are subject to a $10 fine, on top of the unpaid toll. The new lanes opened to traffic on June 22, in time for the America's Cup sailing race being held in Newport. Before the establishment of the E-ZPass system of toll collection, toll discounts were available to the general population through the use of tokens. A roll of 9 bridge crossing tokens could be purchased for $10 (plus one free crossing) bringing the effective price per crossing $1, available to anyone. The establishment of the E-ZPass system and the elimination of tokens also eliminated discounts for non-residents.

50th anniversary
In June 2019, a series of events were held to mark the 50th anniversary of the bridge. On June 28, a ribbon-cutting ceremony was held on the lawn of nearby Gurney's Newport Resort & Marina. In attendance were Senator Sheldon Whitehouse, Zechariah Chafee, son of the late Governor John Chafee, former Governor Donald Carcieri, Dallas Pell, daughter of late Senator Claiborne Pell, and Rep. David Cicilline. The ceremony included a U.S. Coast Guard flyover salute, a fireboat shooting water into the air, and two ribbon-cuttings. In addition, concerts were scheduled for Fort Adams State Park, along with cruises, fireworks, and other events. A documentary on the construction and history of the bridge, titled The Newport Bridge: A Rhode Island Icon, debuted on Rhode Island PBS on December 4.

Reconstruction of approach and onramps
The approach and access road to and from the bridge in Newport was initially intended to be part of a highway connecting to Rhode Island Route 24 in Portsmouth that was never completed. Instead, traffic from the bridge was unloaded at a stoplight on Admiral Kalbfus Highway facing the Newport Grand slot parlor. The onramp bridge for eastbound traffic coming off the Pell Bridge was locally dubbed the "Bridge to Nowhere" or "Highway to Nowhere". Plans to reconstruct and reconfigure the bridge access roads were made between 2001 and 2020. Ground was broken on the new onramp in July 2021. The new approach, which utilizes a former portion of Halsey Street, was opened in October 2022 for eastbound traffic. Traffic in the other direction will continue to use the original access roads until 2023. The so-called "Bridge/Highway to Nowhere" section and other older ramps will be demolished in 2023. Traffic on and off the bridge, as well as internal Newport traffic connecting Admiral Kalbfus Highway to Memorial Boulevard, ceased using the onramps and began using the new connector roads in January 2023.

Impact on the region
The building of the bridge changed Conanicut Island's lifestyle and economy significantly. Before the bridge, Jamestown was a "summer-resident town" accessible only by ferry on the east passage side and the Jamestown Bridge from the mainland over the west passage, in which one-third of the residents owned summer homes. After the bridge it has become a more wealthy community whose residents now commute to jobs and opportunities in neighboring towns. At the same time, the island's local commerce became more dependent on tourism by visitors from off-island.

Gallery

See also

 List of bridges in the United States by height

References

External links

Claiborne Pell Newport Bridge at the Rhode Island Turnpike & Bridge Authority
Claiborne Pell Newport Bridge at BostonRoads.com
Claiborne Pell Newport Bridge at Bridges & Tunnels
Building of the Newport Bridge at Rhode Island State Archives
 

Road bridges in Rhode Island
Narragansett Bay
Suspension bridges in Rhode Island
Bridges in Newport County, Rhode Island
Buildings and structures in Newport, Rhode Island
Toll bridges in Rhode Island
Towers in Rhode Island
Bridges completed in 1969
1969 establishments in Rhode Island